Archduchess Maria Annunciata of Austria (31 July 1876 – 8 April 1961) was a daughter of Archduke Karl Ludwig of Austria and his third wife, Infanta Maria Theresa of Portugal. She was Princess-Abbess of the Theresian Royal and Imperial Ladies Chapter of the Castle of Prague (1894–1918).

Biography
While staying with Archduke Franz Ferdinand of Austria, Duke Siegfried August in Bavaria met his host’s unmarried half-sister, Archduchess Maria Annunciata, he fell in love with her, and their engagement was to be announced in due course. They would have made a comely couple, for the Princess had inherited much of the brilliance as well as good looks of her mother, the beloved Archduchess Maria Theresa, while Duke Siegfried was probably the best looking Prince of his house, a dashing cavalier, and one of the few scions of old world royalty and who had achieved distinction as a steeplechase rider.

Two months later, the engagement was broken off by the Archduchess, owing to her sudden discovery of the stormy antecedents of her fiancé, which she had been ignorant of at the time when she had promised to become his wife. The breaking off of the engagement was a matter which was arranged between the young people themselves, and that they had been deeply in love with each other was shown by the appeal immediately afterward by the Archduchess to the Emperor for permission to enter Holy Orders and to take the vows of a Benedictine nun, while the Duke became prey to melancholia, which in due course developed into insanity, rendering it necessary his confinement.

Emperor Franz Joseph I of Austria declined to allow his niece to become a nun, pointing out to her that she should be content with her office of Abbess of the Order of Noble Ladies of the Hradschin at Prague, which was a sort of semi-ecclesiastical dignity invariably held by a Princess of the Imperial house. The Lady Abbess of this particular order was the only woman to whom is accorded the right of fulfilling certain Episcopal functions, it being the prerogative of her office to crown the Queen of Bohemia when the Cardinal Archbishop of Prague, crowns the King. Among the insignia of her rank are an Episcopal miter and an Episcopal crozier, and she wore an Episcopal ring of office, which the ladies of the order were required to kiss. But there are no pledges of perpetual celibacy taken in connection with the order. Its members are at liberty to wed at any time they wish, this of course entailing their leaving the order, which was organized for the purpose of providing suitably for the ladies of the nobility who had become impoverished through no fault of their own. All that was required of them was the observance of certain rules, the wearing of a particular costume, and the performance of certain daily religious duties and ceremonies. Each of the members of the order bears the honorary title of “Canoness,’ and the Queen Mother of Spain held the office of Abbess until her marriage to King Alfonso, drawing a stipend as such of $30,000 a year.

Archduchess Maria Annunciata took her religious duties in connection with her office more to heart than any of her predecessors. She considered it to be incumbent upon her to break off her engagement to the Prince.

Ancestry

See also
Descendants of Miguel I of Portugal

References

External links

1876 births
1961 deaths
House of Habsburg-Lorraine
Austrian princesses
House of Braganza